AMP is a financial services company in Australia and New Zealand providing superannuation and investment products, financial advice, and banking products (through AMP Banking) including home loans and savings accounts. Its headquarters is in Sydney, Australia.

The Australian Mutual Provident Society was formed in 1849 as a non-profit life insurance company and mutual society. In 1998, it was demutualised into an Australian public company, AMP Limited, and listed on the Australian and New Zealand stock exchanges. 

AMP has one of Australia's largest shareholder registers, with most shareholders living in Australia and New Zealand. This is because when the society demutualised, all policy holders received shares in the new company. 

In 2003, the company demerged its UK operations, creating the Henderson Group.

On 20 April 2018, Craig Meller resigned as CEO after it was revealed in the Royal Commission into Misconduct in the Banking, Superannuation and Financial Services Industry that AMP charged clients for financial advice which was not provided, and misled the Australian Securities & Investments Commission on numerous occasions. More than $1 billion in market value was stripped from AMP shares as news of the company's failings were revealed before the Royal Commission. In the wake of revelations at the banking royal commission and his resignation from AMP, Meller resigned as a financial services adviser to the Turnbull government.

AMP board appointed Franceso De Ferrari as Chief Executive Officer of AMP Limited on 1 December 2018. 
On 25 March 2021, it was announced that De Ferrari would resign. In 2021, he was replaced by Alexis George, formerly of ANZ.

Operations

The company provides financial planning and advice, banking, life insurance, managed funds, superannuation, property, listed assets and infrastructure. It is Australia's largest retail and corporate superannuation provider, and is the largest life risk business in Australia. One of AMP's subsidiaries, AMP Capital, was the aligned wealth manager, with more than A$128 billion in assets under management, making it one of the largest asset managers in the Asia Pacific (excluding Japan) region. AMP Capital has now been stripped out of the AMP Group, along with AMP Life and sold to Dexus and Resolution Capital respectively. AMP Wealth is now the appointed investment manager within the AMP Group.

AMP has four main business areas:
Advice and banking provides financial planning and advice, superannuation services for businesses, and selected banking products. These products and services are primarily distributed through a network of self-employed financial planners. AMP has been granted a [MySuper] authority, enabling it to continue to receive default superannuation contribution from 1 January 2014.
Insurance and superannuation provides superannuation, personal risk insurance products and self-managed super fund administration, support and design. These products and services are primarily distributed through a network of self-employed financial planners
Customer solutions
AMP Capital is a global investment manager.

History

1848 to 1998

David Jones was a foundation director in 1848.

The Australian Mutual Provident Society was formed in 1849 as a non-profit, life-insurance company, and mutual society. George King was chairman for fifteen years from the 1850s. Richard Teece was general manager and actuary from 1890 and a director from 1917 to 1927.

In 1876, the first New Zealand AMP centre was built in Wellington. In 1910, AMP became the first company to provide assurance to soldiers. In 1960, AMP opened its Auckland office.

In 1998, AMP was demutualised into an Australian public company, AMP Limited, and listed on the Australian Securities Exchange and New Zealand Stock Exchange. In 1999, AMP launched AMP Banking, an online bank. In 2003, the company demerged its UK operations, creating the Henderson Group. 

Many of the older AMP buildings in Australia are now heritage-listed and feature the "Amicus" statue group. The central figure in the statue group is the goddess of Peace and Plenty, holding a palm branch (signifying peace) and a cornucopia (symbolising plenty). The male figure of Labour sits to her left and also holds the cornucopia, while the figures of the wife and the child sit on the goddess's right under her palm branch. Under the statue is AMP Society's Latin motto "Amicus certus in re incerta" ("A certain friend in uncertain times").

AXA merger (2011)
On 15 November 2010, AMP announced a bid to merge its business with AXA Asia Pacific Holdings. The transaction was a joint proposal with Axa under which Axa would acquire Axa Asia Pacific Holdings's Asian business' and AMP would acquire AXA's Australian and New Zealand business. 

The Australasian holdings included the former National Mutual business (established in 1869) which was demutualised in 1996. AXA had gained majority ownership of National Mutual in 1999 and renamed the company as AXA Asia Pacific.

The first day of the merged group operating together was 31 March 2011, with the companies to be gradually integrated and the AXA brand being phased out of the Australian and New Zealand market by 2013. In February 2022, AMP delisted from the NZX, consolidating its listing on the Australian Securities Exchange.

Royal commission (2018)
On 20 April 2018 Craig Meller resigned as CEO after it was revealed in the Royal Commission into Misconduct in the Banking, Superannuation and Financial Services Industry that AMP charged clients for financial advice which was not provided, and misled the Australian Securities & Investments Commission on numerous occasions. More than $1 billion in market value was stripped from AMP shares as news of the company's failings were revealed before the Royal Commission. In the wake of revelations at the banking royal commission and his resignation from AMP, Meller resigned as a financial services adviser to the Turnbull government.

On 30 April 2018, Catherine Brenner resigned as chairperson with Mike Wilkins appointed acting CEO and chairperson.

On 8 May 2018, directors Vanessa Wallace and Holly Kramer announced they would not be seeking re-election, in response to an imminent protest vote organised by the shareholders in the aftermath of the Banking Royal Commission. Patty Akopiantz also announced she would be resigning at the end of the year.

In November 2018, AMP admitted to a second overcharging scandal.

In 2019, CEO Francesco De Ferrari launched a billion dollar transformation plan, aiming to recalibrate public opinion on AMP post royal commission.

In July 2021, the Australian Securities & Investments Commission launched a case against AMP in the Federal Court, seeking pecuniary penalties and orders to publish an apology over the 'fee for no service' scandal, where the company would deduct a fee from client's accounts without performing a service. In September 2022, AMP was fined $14.6 million by the Federal Court. AMP had, as of August 2022, paid back $627 million to 331,994 customers affected by the scandal.

See also
AMP Building, for a list of buildings used by AMP Limited
AMP Capital

References

External links

Financial services companies established in 1849
Companies listed on the Australian Securities Exchange
Financial services companies based in Sydney
Insurance companies of Australia
Australian companies established in 1849
1998 initial public offerings